The Kimberley karst gecko (Gehyra girloorloo) is a species of gecko endemic to  Western Australia.

References

Gehyra
Reptiles described in 2016
Geckos of Australia